Hydaticus vittatus, is a species of predaceous diving beetle found in India, Pakistan, Sri Lanka, Nepal, Bangladesh, Bhutan, Myanmar, China, Japan, Taiwan, Thailand, Cambodia, Laos, Vietnam, Malaysia and Indonesia.

Description
Highly variable body shape characterized by geographic variations. Typical body length is about 11.3 to 14.6 mm. Head blackish where anteriorly variable to yellow. Pronotum also black, but with yellowish laterally. There are two bright golden yellow longitudinal lateral stripes in the basal half of elytra. There are large black markings on elytra and pronotum. Yellow stripes at lateral sides of pronotum are narrow. In male, aedeagus in lateral view without a longitudinal ridge near ventral margin in apical third. Posterior margins of first four segments of hind tarsi transversely with a coarse fringe of flat, adpressed, golden-yellow setae.

Biology
Adults are inhabited in rain water pools, muddy buffalo wallows with grassy margins, fish ponds, small streams, puddles on roads, ditches in forests and artificial pools and paddy fields.

Subspecies
Two subspecies identified.

 Hydaticus vittatus angustulus Régimbart, 1899
 Hydaticus vittatus vittatus (Fabricius, 1775)

References 

Dytiscidae
Insects of Sri Lanka
Insects described in 1775